Shantidas Adhikari, popularly known as Shantidas Gosai or Shantidas Goswami, was a Hindu preacher from Sylhet who converted King Pamheiba of Manipur from traditional Meitei religion to Hinduism in 1717 C.E.

He composed the "Vijay Panchali" (also spelled as "Bijoy Panchali"), in which he  projected the land of northeast India's Manipur as the Manipur of the Mahabharata and claiming Babruvahana (Arjuna's son) as the father of Meitei King Nongda Lairen Pakhangba. His work identified Nongda Lairen Pakhangba as "Yavistha".

See also 
 Rajkumar Jhalajit Singh

References

External links 
ISKCON blast: ‘Clues point to Manipuri outfit’ Indian Express - 18 August 2006
Manipuri Literature in History Manipur Research Forum

People from Sylhet District
Indian Hindu missionaries
Gaudiya religious leaders
Year of death unknown
Bengali Hindus
Year of birth unknown